Shun Tak Holdings Limited is a Hong Kong-Macau company founded in 1972. It has been one of the constituents of the Hang Seng Hong Kong MidCap Index since 11 September 2006. The company is active in shipping, property, hospitality and investments businesses. Its shipping division, operating under the name of TurboJET, operates ferry services between Hong Kong and Macau.

The company's founder and executive chairman is Stanley Ho. His daughter Pansy Ho serves as managing director with two of his other daughters, Daisy Ho Chiu-fung and Maisy Ho Chiu-ha, as executive directors as well as David Shum.

History 
Until late 2010, Stanley Ho controlled the company. An 11.55 per cent stake in Shun Tak was transferred by Ho to Hanika Realty, a company controlled by second wife Lucina Laam and his five children with her. The transfer made Hanika Shun Tak's biggest single shareholder.

In April 2015, Shun Tak Holdings Ltd purchased hotel property in Shanghai for RMB700 million (MOP900 million).

In January 2017, Shun Tak acquired Singapore commercial complex for US$246.75 million.

Business operations
The company has extensive shipping and property holdings.  Shipping companies owned include: Conwick Investment Ltd; Far East Hydrofoil Company Ltd; Hong Kong Macao Hydrofoil Company Ltd; Sunrise Field Ltd; Tai Tak Hing Shipping Company Ltd (this was the company, then independent, that owned the steamship ferry , which sank off Lantau in Typhoon Rose in 1971 with the loss of 88 lives, en route from Macau); Wealth Trump Ltd; Shun Tak-China Travel Macau Ferries Ltd (formerly known as Hong Kong-Macau New World First Ferry Services (Macau) Ltd); Companhia de Serviços de Ferry STCT (Macau) (formerly known as New Ferry - Transporte Maritimo de Passageiros (Macau))

Residential Properties in Macau

References

External links
 
 Les Maisons Nassim
 Park Nova Condo

Holding companies of Hong Kong
Companies of Macau
Financial services companies of Hong Kong
Holding companies established in 1972
1972 establishments in Macau
Companies listed on the Hong Kong Stock Exchange
Former companies in the Hang Seng Index